The Scarborough Public Library is the public library serving Scarborough, Maine, United States. The library is located at 48 Gorham Road Scarborough, ME 04074.

References

External links 

Public libraries in Maine
Libraries established in 1899
Libraries in Cumberland County, Maine
Buildings and structures in Scarborough, Maine